Bangana rendahli is a species of cyprinid fish found in the Yangtze and Yuan rivers in China.

References

Bangana
Fish described in 1934